DC Cupcakes is an American reality television series that follows sisters and business partners Sophie LaMontagne and Katherine Kallinis (later Berman) as they run Georgetown Cupcake, a small cupcakery located in Washington, D.C. The series premiered on TLC on July 16, 2010.

Episodes

Series overview

Season 1 (2010)

Season 2 (2011)

Season 3 (2011–2013)

References

External links
 
 
 Georgetown Cupcake website

2010s American reality television series
2010 American television series debuts
2013 American television series endings
English-language television shows
Television shows set in Washington, D.C.
Television shows filmed in Washington, D.C.
Television shows filmed in Maryland
Television shows filmed in Virginia
Television shows filmed in New York City
Television shows filmed in Boston
Television shows filmed in California
Food reality television series
TLC (TV network) original programming
Media about cakes